Richard Wyndham (October 19, 1911 – December 12, 1991) was a Canadian swimmer. He competed in the men's 200 metre breaststroke at the 1932 Summer Olympics.

References

External links
 

1911 births
1991 deaths
Canadian male breaststroke swimmers
Olympic swimmers of Canada
Swimmers at the 1932 Summer Olympics
Place of birth missing